Pahloo is a town and a notified area committee in Kulgam district of the Indian union territory of Jammu and Kashmir.

Geography

Pahloo block is one of the most important block of kulgam district. The transport facilities now much better and it connects many villages like chitripora, Chambgund, Malwan, Devsar, Khaloora,Banimullah,Chambagound etc. There is another link leading to these areas i.e. Cham guns bridge which is newly formed bridge that helped people very much.

References

Cities and towns in Kulgam district